East vs. West – A Hearts of Iron Game is a cancelled grand strategy wargame that was to be set during the Cold War era between 1946–1991.

Gameplay 
East vs. West was not an expansion for Hearts of Iron III, but rather intended as a standalone game. Like many of its predecessors in the Hearts of Iron series, would have allowed the player to take control of and manage a country, including its political, diplomatic, espionage, economic, military, and technological aspects. In contrast to previous installments in the Hearts of Iron series, the game was to be set in the Cold War era, and not focus mainly on large-scale warfare. The use of nuclear weapons in game would have been possible, but it was to be limited by a nation's state of emergency.

Features 
The main focus of the game was the diplomatic, political, economic, military and espionage aspects of countries during the Cold War period and the decisions the player make in regards to them.

Confirmed features included:
 New espionage system utilizing "spy cards".
 An extended political module.
 A Doomsday Clock indicating how close the in game world is to total destruction.
 The presence of the United Nations to intervene in global events.
 The ability to customize ships.
 Nuclear arms race and warfare was to be expanded by a nuclear mapmode, uranium as a resource, factories (centrifuges) to produce enriched fission material, ICBMs that could be launched from silos, nuclear submarines, and a red button.

The game was expected to retain many features included in Hearts of Iron III, such as control over the armed forces, the strategic warfare system, user mods-friendliness, and a multiplayer system with up to 32 players.

Cancellation 
No release date was scheduled for East vs. West after the initial Q1 2013 release date was missed, though following a decision to cut major features including multiplayer functionality from the game, the developers hoped to offer a pay-what-you-want public beta in March 2014. The cancellation of East vs. West was announced in a joint statement on 6 March the same year by BL Logic and Paradox Interactive, citing multiple delays in the project.

References 

Computer wargames
Government simulation video games
Paradox Interactive games
Real-time strategy video games
Cold War video games
Cancelled Windows games
Multiplayer and single-player video games
Grand strategy video games